Thomas Minor Pelly (August 22, 1902 – November 21, 1973) was a U.S. Representative from Washington.

Pelly was born in Seattle to Elizabeth Montgomery (née Minor), daughter of early Seattle mayor Thomas T. Minor, and English-born Bernard Pelly. He attended public schools, the University School in Victoria, British Columbia, and the Hoosac School in Hoosick, New York. He was employed in real estate and the banking industry from 1921 to 1930, after which he was an officer of a printing and stationery company until 1955.

A Republican, Pelly was elected to the U.S. House of Representatives from the Seattle-based first district. He served in Congress for twenty years and did not run for re-election in 1972. Pelly voted in favor of the Civil Rights Acts of 1957, 1960, 1964, and 1968, as well as the 24th Amendment to the U.S. Constitution and the Voting Rights Act of 1965. He died in Ojai, California and is interred at Evergreen Washelli Memorial Park.

References

External links
Biography at Evergreen Washelli Memorial Park

1902 births
1973 deaths
20th-century American politicians
American people of English descent
Businesspeople from Seattle
Politicians from Seattle
Republican Party members of the United States House of Representatives from Washington (state)
20th-century American businesspeople